Washington-Erving Motorsports is a defunct American stock car racing team. It was owned by former NFL running back Joe Washington and former NBA player Julius Erving. Washington and Erving fielded cars in the NASCAR Busch Series (now Xfinity Series) from 1998 to 2000.

Founding 
Washington first piqued his interest in NASCAR by attending the 1997 Daytona 500. He then convinced Erving to come on board, and they formed a team in the summer of 1997. The feelings were split about the new team, which at one time planned to field Winston Cup cars for Rich Bickle. Owner-driver Geoff Bodine was against the team, but others, like Washington's former coach Joe Gibbs and owner-driver Ricky Rudd were in support of the team. The team was only the third fully minority owned team, after Wendell Scott owned his own team and Thee Dixon owned Mansion Motorsports. Before the 1998 season started, the team secured number 50 in honor of that anniversary of Jackie Robinson breaking baseball's color barrier. WEM hired the first female team president in NASCAR, Kathy Thompson.

Busch Series

Car No. 50 History 
In 1998, the team failed to qualify for the first two races of the season with Jimmy Foster. Foster managed to qualify for four of the next five races, plus the Milwaukee race. The team then rotated through nine more drivers. Andy Houston, Dennis Setzer, Jimmy Kitchens, Nathan Buttke, and Joe Buford each made one start. Stanton Barrett made two starts for the team, while Jeff Green and Mike Wallace made three apiece. Dave Rezendes made five starts for the team. The team recorded no wins, top five or top ten finishes during that season.

In 1999, Mark Green drove the entire schedule for the team. He failed to qualify for two races. Green failed to finish seven races, two due to crashes and five due to mechanical mishaps. He recorded one top ten finish, a tenth at Atlanta Motor Speedway. Green and the team parted ways after the 1999 season.

In 2000, the team started out with plans to run the entire season with Tony Roper. However, the team disbanded after Dr Pepper pulled its sponsorship after Roper qualified for only three of the first twelve races.

References 

Defunct NASCAR teams
1997 establishments in North Carolina
2000 disestablishments in North Carolina